The Dudes are a Canadian indie rock band, formed in 1996 in Calgary, Alberta. Dan Vacon is The Dudes' major creative force in the band. The group also includes guitarist Bob Quaschnick, bassist Brock Geiger and newest member Matt Doherty on drums replacing Scott Ross.

Critics have likened their musical style to Modest Mouse, although band members cite their influences as The Flaming Lips, The Descendents, Joel Plaskett, Thrush Hermit and Weezer.

The Dudes gained popularity in Calgary both for their lo-fi approach to recording and releasing albums and for their live stage-show. On their album, Brain Heart Guitar, they worked with Calgary producer Russ Broom, and released the album in 2006 on the LoadMusic record label.

Their music has been played on major Canadian music stations, university radio and CBC Radio 3, and the group has played at North by Northeast, COCA, The Peak and Canadian Music Week. They have toured throughout Canada, Europe and the United States.

Their song "Dropkick Queen of the Weekend" was heard across Canada in 2006, having been featured in a Rogers Wireless advertising campaign.

On January 12, 2007 they released a single from Brain Heart Guitar, "Do the Right Thing". The music video was filmed at Webber Academy, a private school in Calgary, in the summer of 2006.

In June 2009 their album, Blood Guts Bruises Cuts was released in Canada. The latest single to be released in late 2009 is "The Girl Police" which featured in Season 1 of Rookie Blue.  The bulk of the record  Blood Guts Bruises Cuts was Produced and Recorded by Jeff Dawson and Mixed by Mike Fraser.

The latest single in 2012 "American Girl" was also produced by Jeff Dawson and Mixed by Mike Fraser.

2012 saw the release of a third album Barbers, Thieves, and Bartenders a title which comes from a lyric on a song from their previous album entitled "Small Mercies."

Related bands
 Dojo Workhorse – Dan Vacon (Guitar), Matt Doherty (Drums), Bob Quashnick (Slide Guitar), Rob McIntyre (Bass), Brent Gough (Keys), Clea Anais (Cello), Brock Geiger (Guitar), [Chris Vail formerly on Guitar]
 RALEIGH (musical group) – Brock Geiger, Clea Anais, Matt Doherty, Will Maclellan
 The A-Team – Pat Downing, Andy Sparacino, Dan McKinnon
 The Pants Situation – Braden Funchner, Joey Mooney, Dan Laplante, Newman
 Sudden Infant Dance Syndrome – Braden Funchner, Craig Fahner, Sarah Ford, Jesse Locke

 HighKicks - Dan Vacon (Bass), Matt Doherty (Drums)

Discography
 This Guy's the Limit (2002)
 Bee Puncher EP (2003)
 Brain. Heart. Guitar. (2006)
 Blood. Guts. Bruises. Cuts (2009)
 Barbers, Thieves and Bartenders (2012)
 East Side Good Times 5 (2017)

Singles
 "Dropkick Queen of the Weekend" (2006)
 "Do the Right Thing" (January 2007)
 "Fist" (January 2008)
 "Pretty Lies" (May 2009)
 "Mr. Someone Else" (2009)
 "Girl Police" (2009)
 "American Girl" (2012)
 "Saturday Night (My C is alright)" (2018)

See also

Music of Canada
Canadian rock
List of Canadian musicians
List of bands from Canada
:Category:Canadian musical groups

References

External links
 Official site
 The Dudes at MySpace
 Review of Blood Guts Bruises Cuts

Musical groups established in 1996
Canadian indie rock groups
Musical groups from Calgary
1996 establishments in Alberta